Arthur John "Jack" Lohwater (October 20, 1922 - June 10, 1982)  was an American mathematician.

He obtained a Ph.D. in mathematics at University of Rochester (1951), on the dissertation The Boundary Values of a Class of Analytic Functions, advised by Wladimir Seidel. Later he joined the faculty at University of Michigan and Case Western Reserve University. He was editor of Mathematical Reviews (1962–65). With Norman Steenrod and Sydney Gould he established important ties with Russian mathematicians, beginning with conferences in Moscow (1956, 58) and
resulting in a dictionary. Lohwater died after a long battle with lung cancer. He was married to the mathematician Marjorie White Lohwater (1925–2007).

Books
Русско-английский словарь математических терминов. (Russian-English Dictionary of the Mathematical Sciences) (American Mathematical Society, 1961).  The inverse was published by Soviet Academy of Sciences (1961).
The theory of cluster sets (Cambridge University Press, 1966).  With Edward Collingwood.
Global Differentiable Dynamics, Proceedings of the Conference Held at Case Western Reserve University, Cleveland, Ohio, June 2–6, 1969.  With Otomar Hájek and Roger C. McCann (editors)

Translations

Publications

Mathematics in the Soviet Union, in Science 17 May 1957: 974-978

The boundary behaviour of analytic functions, in Itogi Nauki i Techniki, Mat. Anal., 10:99-259, 1973

"Introduction to Inequalities", 1982 (unpublished, reproduced with permission of Marjorie Lohwater) used in the "Introduction to Inequalities" course taught by Lohwater.

Awards
Guggenheim fellowship 1955 (mathematics)

References

20th-century American mathematicians
University of Rochester alumni
University of Michigan faculty
Case Western Reserve University faculty
1922 births
1982 deaths